Nigel Denys Carter CEnv FEI MIEMA (born 1 April 1947) is an English Chartered Environmentalist, politician, member of the Devizes Guardians party since 2002, and a member of Devizes Town Council. He has also served as a Kennet District Councillor and was a Wiltshire Councillor from 2009 to 2013. His first career was as a naval officer.

Career
Born in Marlborough, Wiltshire, Carter was educated at the Britannia Royal Naval College and from there was commissioned into the Royal Navy. He served as a naval officer from 1963 to 1970, receiving his wings as a fixed-wing aircraft pilot and qualifying in gunnery. On 1 May 1968, he was promoted to lieutenant. In 1970 he was discharged from the Navy on medical grounds.

After returning to civilian life, Carter worked for British Petroleum between 1970 and 1992, as a general manager in the Shetland Islands and Africa in the areas of exploration, production, trading, marketing, and distribution. Since 1993 he has been Principal Advisor to En Venture, an environmental consultancy, working as a management consultant on Sustainable development solutions for industry in the Caribbean, the Pacific Rim, and Europe, including the Balkans. His experience includes capacity building in the European Union and Greenhouse gases, as well as the Environmental management system. Places he has lived and worked include Zambia, Singapore, and Hong Kong, and he has made many visits to Sub-Saharan Africa.

In 1986 he received a Certified Diploma in Finance and Accounting from the City Polytechnic, London, and in 2007 Oxford Brookes University awarded him a Certificate in Strategic Environmental Assessment.

Since 1997, Carter has been a member of the United Kingdom's delegation to TC207, otherwise the Technical Committee 207 on Environmental Management of the International Organization for Standardization (ISO). He has been responsible for drafting three ISO standards, ISO 14015 (2001), ISO 19011 (2002), and ISO 14064 (2006). The first is a standard on Environmental management and Environmental assessment of sites and organizations, the second Guidelines for Quality and Environmental Management Systems Auditing, and the third a Specification with Guidance at the organization level for Quantification and Reporting of Greenhouse Gas Emissions and Removals.

He is a Fellow of the Energy Institute, a professional body, and a member of the Institute of Environmental Management and Assessment.

Political life
By 2001, Carter was living in Devizes, Wiltshire, and in that year a new local political party called the Devizes Guardians began to be formed, in the aftermath of the felling of five trees in the Devizes Market Place, where Carter's office then was. The party registered with the Electoral Commission on 19 June 2002. In its registration, it named Carter as its leader and chairman.

On 1 May 2003, Carter was elected to Kennet District Council as a Devizes Guardian, in the Devizes North ward, commenting "We have to acknowledge there is an element of protest vote in the support we have had. The question of the future of the hospital has been paramount in the issues expressed by the people we have talked to, with transport coming a close second." However, four years later in May 2007 he lost the seat to a Conservative.

The District of Kennet was abolished in April 2009, as part the 2009 structural changes to local government in England, and replaced by a new Wiltshire Council unitary authority. In the first elections to the new authority, on 4 June 2009, Carter was elected as a member for Devizes North. He is also a school governor and a member of the Devizes Development Partnership.

In Wiltshire Council, the Devizes Guardians held three seats from 2009 to 2013, and these members formed a political group with Carter as Leader. However, they lost all these seats at the local elections of May 2013.

See also

2009 Wiltshire Council election
2013 Wiltshire Council election
2017 Wiltshire Council election

References

1947 births
Graduates of Britannia Royal Naval College
Living people
Royal Navy officers
English environmentalists
Members of Wiltshire Council